Ram Nihor Rai also spelt as  Ram Nihore is an Indian politician belonging to the Janata Dal.  He was elected to the Lok Sabha the lower house of Indian Parliament from Robertsganj in Uttar Pradesh in 1991.

References

External links
Official biographical sketch in Parliament of India website

India MPs 1991–1996
Lok Sabha members from Uttar Pradesh
1934 births
Living people
People from Sonbhadra district